Amirul Alam Milon is a Bangladesh Awami League politician and the former Member of Parliament of Bagerhat-4.

Early life 
Milon was born on 22 January 1953 in Bagerhat District.

Career 
Milon was a lawyer. he was the president of Rajshahi University Chhatra League from 1979 to 1981. He was the general secretary of Morelganj Upazila Awami League in 1991. He was the president of Morelganj Upazila Awami League in 2003. He was a member of the Central Executive Committee of Bangladesh Awami League for the term of 2018 and 2019. In 2015, he served as the director of the Jiban Bima Corporation.

He was elected to parliament from Bagerhat-4 as a Bangladesh Awami League candidate in 2020 by-election. The election were called after the incumbent, Mozammel Hossain, died in office.

References

Awami League politicians
Living people
11th Jatiya Sangsad members
1953 births
People from Bagerhat District
University of Rajshahi alumni
20th-century Bangladeshi lawyers